Vladimir Radunsky (1 March 1954 – 11 September 2018) was a Russian-born American artist, designer, author and illustrator who lived in Rome.

Life and work 
Born in the Russian city of Perm, Vladimir Radunsky grew up in Moscow where he studied fine art, design and architecture. In 1973, he studied at the Moscow Architectural Institute. In 1982, he emigrated to New York, became a US citizen, and continued his work as a graphic designer, producing mainly art books and children's books.

Radunsky produced very different types of books, such as a book of shapes for young readers, Square Triangle Round Skinny (a set of four books shaped the way their titles suggest); Discovery, a lyrical poem by Nobel-prize winner Joseph Brodsky about the discovery of America, and What Does Peace Feel Like?, a compilation of conversations with children during school visits in the US and Europe. His interactive book, Le Grand Bazar, subtitled For people with imagination age 5 to 105 (published in Paris by Edition du Panama), requires the reader to use scissors, pen, and stapler. Boy Meets Girl is to be read forward, backward, upside down and inside out. The Mighty Asparagus (Harcourt) combines the works of Italian Renaissance painters with his own paintings in a collage. The Hip-Hop Dog, written by Chris Raschka (HarperCollins), is hip-hop poetry for children, where graffiti art has migrated from walls into a printed book.

For his exhibition at Milanese gallery Nina Due and, subsequently, at the Palazzo delle Esposizioni in Rome, Radunsky presented a unique collection of clothes for animals. Among the works that he designed were an anaconda's wedding dress, a horse's riding breeches, and a hippo's bathing trunks.

For the new production of the ballet Don Quixote at the Roman Teatro dell'Opera's 2017-2018 season, Radunsky created the set and costumes. The libretto, originally created in the middle of the nineteenth century by the French Choreographer Marius Petipa, inspired Radunsky to design the set as an enormous pop-up book.

Death and family
Having been diagnosed with multiple myeloma years earlier, Radunsky died at a hospital near his home in Rome at the age of 64. He and his wife Eugenia Uritsky, whom he married in 1987, had two daughters and moved to Italy when the children were young because he wanted "to be surrounded by beautiful things".

Bibliography 
 Mother Goose of Pudding Lane author Chris Raschka 2019, Candlewick Press
 If I met Bemelmans… 2015, Buffalo Zine (issue No.3)
 Alphabetabum author Chris Raschka 2014, The New York Review Children's Collection
 On a Beam of Light author Jennifer Berne 2013, Chronicle Books
 Advice to Little Girls author Mark Twain 2013, Enchanted Lion Books	
 Consigli alle bambine di Mark Twain 2010, Donzelli 
 Hip-Hop Dog author Chris Raschka 2010, Harper Collins
 You? 2009, Harcourt Children's Books
 Where The Giant Sleeps author Mem Fox 2007, Harcourt Children's Books
 Because... in collaboration with Mikhail Baryshnikov 2007, Ginee Seo Books
 Le Grand Bazar 2006, Les Editions Du Panama
 Fire! Fire! Said Mrs. McGuire author Bill Martin Jr 2006, Harcourt Children's Books
 I Love You Dude 2005, Gulliver Books
 Boy Meets Girl in collaboration with Chris Raschka 2004, Seuil
 What Does Peace Feel Like? 2004, Simon & Schuster/Anne Schwartz Books
 The Mighty Asparagus 2004, Harcourt/Silver Whistle New York Times Best Illustrated Books Award
 # 1 (one) 2003, Viking
 Manneken Pis, a Simple Story of a Boy Who Peed on a War 2002, Atheneum/Anne Schwartz Books
 # 10 (ten) 2002, Viking
 Square Triangle Round Skinny (four books in a box) 2002, Candlewick Press
 Table Manners in collaboration with Chris Raschka 2001, Candlewick Press
 My Dolly author Woody Guthrie 2001, Candlewick Press
 Bling Blang author Woody Guthrie 2000, Candlewick Press
 Howdi Do author Woody Guthrie 2000, Candlewick Press
 Discovery author Joseph Brodsky 1999, Farrar, Straus & Giroux
 An Edward Lear Alphabet author Edward Lear 1999, Harper Collins Children's Books
 Yucka Drucka Droni in collaboration with Eugenia Radunsky 1998, Scholastic
 Telephone author Kornei Chukovsky translated by Jamey Gambrell 1996, North-South Books
 The Maestro Plays author Bill Martin Jr 1994, Henry Holt and Co.
 The Story of a Boy Named Will author Daniil Kharms translated by Jamey Gambrell 1993, NorthSouth Books
 Hail to Mail author Samuel Marshak translator Richard Pevear 1990, Henry Holt and Company
 The Pup Grew Up author Samuel Marshak translator Richard Pevear 1989, Henry Holt and Co.
 The Riddle author Adele Vernon 1987, Dodd, Mead & Co.

References 

1954 births
Artists from Moscow
Soviet emigrants to the United States
American expatriates in Italy
2018 deaths
American writers
American illustrators
American graphic designers
People with multiple myeloma